Faye Disc is a 1994 EP recorded by Chinese Cantopop singer Faye Wong when she was based in Hong Kong.

Track listing
"Reminiscence is a Red Sky" (Wui Yik See Hoong Sik Teen Hoong) –
"Only Me" (Zhi You Wo Zi Ji) –
"冷戰" - Cold War
"Because I Love Faye" –

Faye Wong albums
1994 EPs
Cinepoly Records EPs
Cantopop EPs